The 1993 season of the National Football Jia-A League was the top tier of football in China. It comprised eight teams, and Liaoning Dongyao won the championship.

First round

Group A

Group B

Second round

Championship group

Consolation group

Award
24 players were awarded the Athlete Award on February 26, 1993.
Chi Minghua, Li Chaoyang, Wu Wenbing from Guangdong Hongyuan
Sun Wei, Li Zheng, Sun Xianlu from Liaoning Dongyao
Li Longhai, Liu Jun,  from Shanghai Agfa
Zhuang Liansheng, Wang Zheng, Gao Mingyuan from Bayi 999
Li Yong, Huang Qineng, Cai Qinghui from Guangzhou Apollo
Zhao Shigang, Zhang Enhua, Han Wenhai from Dalian Hualu
Xie Shaojun, Gao Feng, Cao Xiandong from Beijing Guoan
Li Xianzhong, Le Jingzhong, Zhang Weiqiu from Foshan

References
China - List of final tables (RSSSF)
1993 Chinese Jia-A League at Zuqiuziliao.cn 

Chinese Jia-A League seasons
1
China
China
1993 establishments in China